Valparaiso, colloquially Valpo, is a city and the county seat of Porter County, Indiana, United States. The population was 34,151 at the 2020 census.

History
The site of present-day Valparaiso was included in the purchase of land from the Potawatomi people by the U.S. Government in October 1832. Chiqua's town or Chipuaw was located a mile east of the current Courthouse along the Sauk Trail.  Chiqua's town existed from or before 1830 until after 1832.  The location is just north of the railroad crossing on State Route 2 and County Road 400 North.

Located on the ancient Native American trail from Rock Island to Detroit, the town had its first log cabin in 1834. Established in 1836 as Portersville, county seat of Porter County, it was renamed to Valparaiso (meaning "Vale of Paradise" in Old Spanish) in 1837 after Valparaíso, Chile, near which the county's namesake David Porter battled in the Battle of Valparaiso during the War of 1812. The city was once called the "City of Churches" due to the large number of churches located there at the end of the 19th century. Valparaiso Male and Female College, one of the earliest higher education institutions admitting both men and women in the country, was founded in Valparaiso in 1859, but closed its doors in 1871 before reopening in 1873 as the Northern Indiana Normal School and Business Institute. In the early 20th century, it became Valparaiso College, then Valparaiso University. It was initially affiliated with the Methodist Church but after 1925 with the Lutheran University Association (which has relationships both with the Lutheran Church Missouri Synod, and with the Evangelical Lutheran Church in America) and expanded significantly after World War II.

From the 1890s until 1969, there were no African-American residents in Valparaiso. This has been attributed to Valparaiso being a sundown town. There was also substantial activity by the Ku Klux Klan, which negotiated to purchase Valparaiso University in 1923. The first African-American family to move to Valparaiso faced intimidation and eventually left the city when a visiting relative was murdered. In recent years, the city's racial composition has diversified.

Valparaiso also has a long history of being a transportation hub for the region. In 1858, the Pittsburgh, Fort Wayne and Chicago Railroad reached Valparaiso, connecting the city directly to Chicago. By 1910, an interurban railway connected the city to Gary, Indiana. Today, while the city no longer has a passenger train station, it is still very much a part of the "Crossroads of America" due to its proximity to I-65, I-80, I-90, and I-94. Additionally, the Canadian National railroad still runs freight on the tracks, including through the downtown area.

Until 1991, Valparaiso was the terminal of Amtrak's Calumet commuter service.

Geography

The city is situated at the junctions of U.S. Route 30, State Road 2, and State Road 49.

Topography
The city is situated on the Valparaiso Moraine.

Glaciation has left numerous features on the landscape here. Kettle lakes and knobs make up much of this hilly area of Northwest Indiana. The Pines Ski Area is the only remaining kame in the city; the other one is under the university's Chapel of the Resurrection, however, grading of land in that area makes that particular kame almost nonexistent. Many glacial erratics can be found throughout the city. The moraine has left the city with mostly clay soil.

Climate

Demographics

2010 census
As of the census of 2010, there were 31,730 people, 12,610 households, and 7,117 families residing in the city. The racial makeup of the city was 89.9% White, 3.3% African American, 0.3% Native American, 2.1% Asian, 0.1% Pacific Islander, 2.2% from other races, and 2.1% from two or more races. Hispanic or Latino of any race were 7.1% of the population.

There were 12,610 households, of which 28.7% had children under the age of 18 living with them, 41.6% were married couples living together, 10.9% had a female householder with no husband present, 3.9% had a male householder with no wife present, and 43.6% were non-families. 34.5% of all households were made up of individuals, and 11.3% had someone living alone who was 65 years of age or older. The average household size was 2.28 and the average family size was 2.99.

The median age in the city was 33.4 years. 21.3% of residents were under the age of 18; 15.9% were between the ages of 18 and 24; 26.9% were from 25 to 44; 22.8% were from 45 to 64; and 13.1% were 65 years of age or older. The gender makeup of the city was 48.6% male and 51.4% female.

2000 census
As of the census of 2000, there were 27,428 people, 10,867 households, and 6,368 families residing in the city. The population density was 971.6/km2 (2,515.4/mi2). There were 11,559 housing units at an average density of 409.4/km2 (1,060.1/mi2). The racial makeup of the city was 94.35% White, 1.60% African American, 0.23% Native American, 1.49% Asian, 0.02% Pacific Islander, 0.79% from other races, and 1.52% from two or more races. Hispanic or Latino of any race were 3.34% of the population.

There were 10,867 households, out of which 28.8% had children under the age of 18 living with them, 45.9% were married couples living together, 9.7% had a female householder with no husband present, and 41.4% were non-families. 33.4% of all households were made up of individuals, and 10.9% had someone living alone who was 65 years of age or older. The average household size was 2.27 and the average family size was 2.93.

In the city, the population was spread out, with 21.2% under the age of 18, 17.4% from 18 to 24, 28.1% from 25 to 44, 20.2% from 45 to 64, and 13.1% who were 65 years of age or older. The median age was 33 years. For every 100 females, there were 91.8 males. For every 100 females age 18 and over, there were 88.5 males.

The median income for a household in the city was $45,799, and the median income for a family was $60,637. Males had a median income of $46,452 versus $26,544 for females. The per capita income for the city was $22,509. About 4.8% of families and 9.1% of the population were below the poverty line, including 8.1% of those under age 18 and 7.5% of those age 65 or over.

Arts and culture
 Featured in Valparaiso, a play by Don DeLillo
 The Valparaiso Downtown Commercial District, Washington Street Historic District, and the Banta Neighborhood feature many historic homes; architectural designs include, Italianate, Arts & Crafts, and English/Cottswold.

Live theater
 Chicago Street Theatre, run by the local Community Theater Guild.
 The Memorial Opera House, a musical theater venue.
 Valparaiso Theatrical Company, a non-profit community theatre group focused on providing fund-raising opportunities for other non-profit organizations through theatrical performance.

Museums
 Brauer Museum of Art at Valparaiso University
 Museum of Fire Fighting
 Porter County Museum, also known as the Old Jail Museum

City fairs

The city holds two major festivals every year: the Popcorn Festival and the Porter County Fair. The Popcorn Festival is held on the first Saturday after Labor Day. It honors Orville Redenbacher, a former resident who built a popcorn factory there. Redenbacher participated in most of the festival's parades until his death in 1995. The festival also features foot racing events and multiple concerts in addition to typical fair activities. The Porter County Fair consists of carnival attractions and hosts a variety of shows such as a demolition derby, motocross races, and live musical performances.

Public library
Valparaiso has a public library, a branch of the Porter County Public Library System.

Historic buildings and districts
 Porter County Courthouse replaced an earlier brick building in 1883.  The current building is 128 feet by 98 feet.  It was built with a square tower rising out of the center.  The tower was 168 feet tall with a clock on each side.  A fire in 1934 damaged in the interior requiring the removal of the tower.

National Register of Historic Places

There are a number of buildings and districts in the city listed on the National Register of Historic Places. 

 Conrad and Catherine Bloch House
 Haste-Crumpacker House
 Heritage Hall 
 Immanuel Lutheran Church 
 Dr. David J. Loring Residence and Clinic 
 William McCallum House
 Charles S. and Mary McGill House
 Porter County Jail and Sheriff's House 
 Porter County Memorial Opera Hall 
 David Garland Rose House
 DeForest Skinner House 
 Valparaiso Downtown Commercial District
 Washington Street Historic District (Valparaiso, Indiana)

Parks and recreation
Valparaiso has an extensive city park district. In 2005 there were 13 parks with another in the planning stages.

Parks

200 East (East McCord Rd) – a community park with a playground; where many of the city's legendary athletes played football as youngsters. Football at 200 East Park is a staple for young kids growing up in the neighborhood.  
Bicentennial Park (Burlington Beach Road & Campbell St) – Provides a full range of activities, including a playground, basketball courts, ball diamond and picnic shelters.  A prairie restoration is under way in the north half of the park.
Central Park Plaza (Lincolnway and Lafayette St) – is the centerpiece of the Downtown Valparaiso revitalization and opened the summer of 2011. It has an outdoor amphitheater for concerts and other special events as well as a splash pad in the center of the park for kids to play. 
Fairgrounds Park (Calumet & Evans Avenues) – Has the largest complex of ball diamonds and soccer fields in the city.  A playground and basketball court are available.  Numerous city sports leagues use Fairgrounds Park for their games and tournaments.  The park is surrounded by a paved walking circuit that is well occupied on nice days.
Foundation Meadows (Campbell Street & Bullseye Lake Rd) – One of the city's newer parks.
Glenrose South (1500 Roosevelt Road) – Provides several ball diamonds and when school is out, Thomas Jefferson Middle Schools track is available for those interested in walking.  Glenrose South has been the home of the Valparaiso Fourth of July Fireworks display and celebration since 2005.
Jessee-Pifer Park (Elmhurst & Madison Streets) – a community park with a basketball court and picnic shelter.
Kirchhoff Miller Woods, (Roosevelt Road & Institute St – a community park that provides for basketball, baseball, tennis, picnicking and a playground.
Ogden Gardens/Forest Park (Campbell Street and Harrison Blvd) – Ogden Gardens is the home of the city's botanical garden.  The Campbell Street end is a formal garden with a variety of planting that bloom throughout the year.  The Gazebo is a favorite place for weddings, wedding pictures and high school prom pictures.  A Japanese garden is included with a 22,000-gallon Koi pond.  Forest Park is to the west with an open grassy picnic area below a wooded picnic area with a shelter.  
Rogers-Lakewood Park (Meridian Road (N Campbell Street)) – Provide opportunities for swimming, fishing, and hiking trails.  It is connected to the north side communities of Valparaiso by the Campbell Street Bike Trail (hiking and biking).
Tower Park (Evans Ave and Franklin St.) is a community park that offers basketball, baseball, tennis, picnicking and a playground.  During winter months, one of the basketball courts is turned into the community skating rink.
Valplayso/Glenrose North (Glendale Blvd and Roosevelt Rd) is the home of Valplayso, a community-designed and community-built playground.  At the other end of the parking lot are several ball fields.  Separated from Glenrose South by only the Middle Schools track, Glenrose North hosts over half of the community during the Fourth of July Celebration.
West Side Park (Joliet Rd) is a community park with a ball field and a playground.
Will Park (Morgan Blvd and Brown St) is a community park with a basketball court, playground, and picnic shelter.

Golf
Valparaiso Country Club
Forest Park
Creekside
Mink Lake (Closed)
The Course at Aberdeen

Bike trails
Valparaiso is building a series of bike trails across the city.  Currently, (March 2012) most of the identified bike routes are part of the county's system of recommended roads and streets.

Biking and hiking
Campbell Street Bikeway runs from Rogers-Lakewood Park south  to Vale Park Road (CR 400 N).

At Vale Park, it connects to the Vale Park trail to Valparaiso Street .  A new bike loop  is being built that circles north along Valparaiso Street to Bullseye Lake Rd, east to Cumberland Crossing (not open to the public (2008), south to Vale Park, turning west to on Vale Park to return to the corner of Vale Park and Valparaiso Street.

At Glendale, the Campbell Street Bikeway connects to the Glendale cross town bike lane.  These travel east  on Glendale, ending on North Calumet at the Walgreens corner.

Government
Valparaiso has an elected mayor, an elected clerk-treasurer, and an elected council.  All of these positions are elected for four-year terms in November of the year before a presidential election year and assumes office on January 1.

Education

Higher education
Valparaiso University was founded in 1859, and occupies  on the south side of the city near downtown. The university is a cultural center of the city, hosting venues such as the Brauer Museum of Art, with more than 2,700 pieces of 19th- and 20th century American art.

Ivy Tech operates one of its 23 regional campuses in the city. From 2006 until 2016, Purdue University North Central had a two-building satellite campus in Valparaiso.

Primary and secondary education
Public schools 
Valparaiso Community Schools
Valparaiso High School
Porter County Career and Technical Center
Benjamin Franklin Middle School
Thomas Jefferson Middle School
Central Elementary
Cooks Corner Elementary School
Heavilin Elementary
Flint Lake Elementary School
Thomas Jefferson Elementary School
Memorial Elementary
Northview Elementary School
Parkview Elementary
East Porter County Schools
Washington Township High School; serves part of the city of Valparaiso
Private schools
Christ Baptist Christian Academy
The Classical Academy
Immanuel Lutheran School (K-8)
Montessori School of Valparaiso
Saint Paul's Catholic School (K-8)
Spirit Of God Accelerated Education,
South Haven Christian School
Victory Christian Academy

Media

Newspapers
Valparaiso is served by two regional newspapers:
 The Times of Northwest Indiana (or NWI Times), was founded in 1906 and is the second largest of Indiana's 76 daily newspapers. It is based on Munster.
 The Post-Tribune of Northwest Indiana was founded in 1907, serving the Northwest Indiana region. The Post-Tribune is owned by Tribune Company and is based in Merrillville.

Magazines
North Valpo Neighbors and South Valpo Neighbors are published in Valparaiso.

Radio
The primary local radio stations are WLJE 105.5 FM "Indiana 105", which broadcasts country music, WAKE 1500 AM, which plays adult standards, and WVLP 98.3 FM "ValpoRadio", a non-profit, low power FM community radio station. Valparaiso formerly had a fourth local station, WNWI 1080 AM, which relocated to Oak Lawn, Illinois in 1998 and is now a Chicago-market station. Radio is usually from the Chicago market.

Infrastructure
The supply is treated with chlorine solution to remove the iron. Valparaiso also has three sewer retention basins.

Valparaiso's energy is provided by NIPSCO. The Schaeffer Power Plant is located south of Valparaiso, in Wheatfield.

A city bus service, the V-Line, was founded in 2007.  It operates between downtown, the university, shopping centers, the city's northern neighborhoods, and Dune Park station of the Northern Indiana Commuter Transit District.

On October 6, 2008, Valparaiso inaugurated an express bus service to and from Chicago, Illinois called ChicaGo DASH.  Buses depart Valparaiso on weekday mornings and return from Chicago in the evenings.

Valparaiso is served by four highways. U.S. Route 30 is the major east–west artery on the southern side of the city. Indiana State Road 49, the major north–south artery, connects with Chesterton, Indiana and the Indiana Toll Road. Indiana Route 130 runs northwest to Hobart, Indiana. Indiana State Road 2, which connects South Bend and Lowell, passes through the southeast corner of the city.

Three railroads pass through the city. The Norfolk Southern Railway operates on the tracks that were previously the Nickel Plate Road, the Canadian National is the former Grand Trunk Western Railroad and the Chicago, Fort Wayne and Eastern Railroad operates on the tracks that were previously used by the Pennsylvania Railroad.

Notable people

 Newton Arvin, literary critic 
 John L. Bascom, politician 
 Harry Benham, actor
 Beulah Bondi, actress 
 Mary Blatchley Briggs (1846– 1910), writer and women's organizer
 Kevin L. Brown, former Major League Baseball (MLB) player 
 Mark N. Brown, astronaut 
 Josephine Cochrane, invented and patented the modern dishwasher
 Bryce Drew, professional basketball player in the National Basketball Association (NBA), 1998–2004; head coach for Vanderbilt University men's basketball team since 2016 
 Michael Essany, reality television talk show host and author
 Gina Fattore, producer and writer of Dawson's Creek, Gilmore Girls, Parenthood and showrunner of Dare Me
 Chris Funk, guitarist for The Decemberists 
 Henry C. Gordon, astronaut
 Mark A. Heckler, 18th president of Valparaiso University
 Robbie Hummel, professional basketball player in the NBA since 2012 
 Samuel Austin Kendall, politician 
 Mike Kellogg, retired Moody Radio announcer
 Hub Knolls, former pitcher in Major League Baseball
 Heather Kuzmich, 4th runner-up of America's Next Top Model, Cycle 9
 Earl F. Landgrebe, politician, staunch defender of Richard Nixon 
Charles F. Lembke, architect and contractor. He built many downtown area buildings, such as the Memorial Opera House, Carnegie public Library, Hotel Lembke, and several local schools. .
 David E. Lilienthal, politician 
 Orville Redenbacher, hybrid popcorn developer 
 Sean Manaea, professional baseball player in MLB
 Jeff Samardzija, professional baseball player in MLB 
 Carly Schroeder, actress 
 Walter Wangerin, Jr., author and professor at Valparaiso University 
 R. Harold Zook, architect

See also

 List of cities in Indiana
 Valpo Velvet

References

External links

 
 Greater Valparaiso Chamber of Commerce 

 
Cities in Porter County, Indiana
Chicago metropolitan area
County seats in Indiana
Cities in Indiana
Populated places established in 1836
Northwest Indiana
1836 establishments in Indiana